The Antiguan Barbudan Ambassador to China is the official representative of the Government of Antigua and Barbuda to the Government of the People's Republic of China.

The embassy of Antigua and Barbuda is in Beijing.

References 

China
Antigua and Barbuda
Ambassadors